Nguyễn Văn Đương (born 2 October 1996) is a Vietnamese amateur boxer. He won a silver medal at the 2019 Southeast Asian Games and later qualified for the 2020 Summer Olympics.

Early years
Đương was born in the village of Hoàng Thanh in northern Vietnam in 1996. At the age of 13 he accompanied his cousin to Hanoi, where he had been training at the People's Public Security boxing club. Đương was initially rejected because of his weight – he weighed only 32 kg at the time – but was allowed to join after two months of strength training. He competed at his first youth national championships in 2010, winning a gold medal.

Career
In October 2019, Đương knocked out the previously undefeated Jenel Lausa as the main undercard of the Victory 8: Legends of Hoan Kiem event in Hanoi. 

Đương won a silver medal in the bantamweight event at the 2019 Southeast Asian Games, defeating Nanthavong Simphavong of Laos and Naing Latt of Myanmar before losing to Thai legend Chatchai-decha Butdee in the final. 

Three months later Đương fought in the 2020 Asia & Oceania Olympic Qualification Tournament in Jordan. In his opening bout, he stopped Charlie Senior of Australia. In the quarterfinals, he shocked Chatchai-decha Butdee, beating him in only 47 seconds after scoring two quick knockdowns. Although Đương lost his semifinal matchup against Mohammad Al-Wadi by split decision, his two previous victories secured his spot at the 2020 Summer Olympics, making him the first-ever Vietnamese boxer to earn direct qualification to the competition (as opposed to a wild-card berth).

Đương also won back-to-back national championships in 2019 and 2020. He came in second place in a vote for Vietnam's "most valuable athlete" of 2020, ranked only behind footballer Nguyễn Văn Quyết.

References

External links
 
 Amateur boxing record at BoxRec

Living people
1996 births
Vietnamese male boxers
Bantamweight boxers
Featherweight boxers
Competitors at the 2019 Southeast Asian Games
Southeast Asian Games medalists in boxing
Southeast Asian Games silver medalists for Vietnam
Olympic boxers of Vietnam
Boxers at the 2020 Summer Olympics
People from Bắc Giang Province